Amoenitates Academicae is the title of a multi-volume zoological and botanical publication (published during 1749–1790) consisting of the dissertations of the students of Carl Linnaeus, written during 1743–1776.

Seven out of ten volumes were published by Linnaeus himself, the last three were edited by 
Johann Christian von Schreber.

Editions 

 vol. 1: 1st ed., Stockholm and Leipzig, 1749, 2nd ed., Erlangen, 1787
 vol. 2: 1st ed., Stockholm, 1751; 2nd ed., Stockholm, 1762; 3rd ed., 1787 
 vol. 3: 1st ed., Stockholm, 1756; 2nd ed., Erlangen, 1787
 vol. 4: 1st ed., Stockholm, 1759; 2nd ed., Erlangen, 1788
 vol. 5: 1st ed., Stockholm, 1760; 2nd ed., Erlangen, 1788
 vol. 6: 1st ed., Stockholm, 1763; 2nd ed., Erlangen, 1789
 vol. 7: 1st ed., Stockholm, 1769; 2nd ed., Erlangen, 1789
 vol. 8: 1st ed., Erlangen, 1785
 vol. 9: 1st ed., Erlangen, 1785
 vol. 10: 1st ed., Erlangen, 1790

References 
 Richard Pulteney: A general view of the writings of Linnaeus. London, 2. Auflage, 1805,  350ff.
 John L. Heller: Notes on the Titulature of Linnaean Dissertations. In: Taxon,  32.2, May 1983, 218–252

External links 

 The Linnean Collections, The Linnean Society 

Carl Linnaeus
Biological literature
Zoological literature
Botanical literature